A total solar eclipse occurred at the Moon's descending node of the orbit on August 1, 2008. A solar eclipse occurs when the Moon passes between Earth and the Sun, thereby totally or partly obscuring the image of the Sun for a viewer on Earth. A total solar eclipse occurs when the Moon's apparent diameter is larger than the Sun's, blocking all direct sunlight, turning day into darkness. Totality occurs in a narrow path across Earth's surface, with the partial solar eclipse visible over a surrounding region thousands of kilometres wide.
It had a magnitude of 1.0394 that was visible from a narrow corridor through northern Canada (Nunavut), Greenland, central Russia, eastern Kazakhstan, western Mongolia and China. Occurring north of the arctic circle, it belonged to the so-called midnight sun eclipses. The largest city in the path of the eclipse was Novosibirsk in Russia. Occurring only 2.5 days after perigee (Perigee on July 29, 2008), the Moon's apparent diameter was larger than average.

The moon's apparent diameter was 1 arcminute, 17.8 arcseconds (77.8 arcseconds) larger than the February 7, 2008 annular solar eclipse.

This was the first eclipse this season, with the second being the 16 August 2008 partial lunar eclipse.

The total eclipse lasted for 2 minutes 27 seconds, and covered 0.4% of the Earth's surface in a 10,200 km long path. It was the 47th eclipse of the 126th Saros cycle, which began with a partial eclipse on March 10, 1179, and will conclude with a partial eclipse on May 3, 2459.

A partial eclipse could be seen from the much broader path of the Moon's penumbra, including northeastern North America and most of Europe and Asia.

It was described by observers as "special for its colours around the horizon. There were wonderful oranges and reds all around, the clouds lit up, some dark in silhouette, some golden, glowing yellowy-orange in the distance. You could see the shadow approaching against the clouds and then rushing away as it left."

The moon's apparent diameter was larger because the eclipse was occurring only 58 hours, 56 minutes after perigee.

Start of eclipse: Canada and Greenland 
Animated path

The eclipse began in the far north of Canada in Nunavut at 09:21 UT, the zone of totality being 206 km wide, and lasting for 1 minute 30 seconds. The path of the eclipse then headed north-east, crossing over northern Greenland and reaching the northernmost latitude of 83° 47′ at 09:38 UT before dipping down into Russia.

The path of totality touched the northeast corner of Kvitøya, an uninhabited Norwegian island in the Svalbard archipelago, at 09:47 UT.

Greatest eclipse: Russia 
The eclipse reached the Russian mainland at 10:10 UT, with a path 232 km wide and a duration of 2 minutes 26 seconds. The greatest eclipse occurred shortly after, at 10:21:07 UT at coordinates  (close to Nadym), when the path was 237 km wide, and the duration was 2 minutes 27 seconds. Cities in the path of the total eclipse included Megion, Nizhnevartovsk, Strezhevoy, Novosibirsk and Barnaul. Around 10,000 tourists were present in Novosibirsk, the largest city to experience the eclipse. For Gorno-Altaysk the eclipse was the second consecutive total solar eclipse after the March 2006 eclipse.

Conclusion: Mongolia and China 
The path of the eclipse then moved south-east, crossing into Mongolia and just clipping Kazakhstan at around 10:58 UT. The path here was 252 km wide, but the duration decreased to 2 minutes 10 seconds. The path then ran down the China-Mongolia border, ending in China at 11:18 UT, with an eclipse lasting 1 minute 27 seconds at sunset. The total eclipse finished at 11:21 UT. The total eclipse passed over Altay City, Hami and Jiuquan. Around 10,000 people were gathered to watch the eclipse in Hami.

Partial eclipse 
A partial eclipse was seen from the much broader path of the Moon's penumbra, including the north east coast of North America and most of Europe and Asia. In London, England, the partial eclipse began at 09:33 BST, with a maximum eclipse of 12% at 10:18 BST, before concluding at 11:05 BST. At Edinburgh the partial eclipse was 23.5%, whilst it was 36% in Lerwick in the Shetland Isles.

LTU 1111 
German charter airline LTU, now trading as Air Berlin, operated a special flight from Düsseldorf to the North Pole to observe the eclipse. Flight number LT 1111 spent over 11 hours in the air, returning to base at 6pm after flying a planeload of eclipse chasers, scientists, journalists and TV crews to watch the celestial event. The route also included a low-level sightseeing tour of Svalbard before the eclipse and the magnetic pole afterwards.

More details about the Total Solar Eclipse of 1 August 2008. 

Eclipse Magnitude: 1.03942

Eclipse Obscuration: 1.08040

Gamma: 0.83070

Greatest Eclipse: 2008 August 1 at 10:22:12.3 TD (10:21:06.7 UTC)

Sun right ascension: 8.8

Sun declination: 17.9

Sun diameter (arcseconds): 1891.0

Moon right ascension: 8.82

Moon declination: 18.6

Moon diameter (arcseconds): 1948.2

Delta T: 1 minute, 5.7 seconds

Saros series: 126th (47 of 72)

Related eclipses

Eclipses of 2008 
 An annular solar eclipse on February 7.
 A total lunar eclipse on February 21.
 A total solar eclipse on August 1.
 A partial lunar eclipse on August 16.

Tzolkinex 
 Preceded: Solar eclipse of June 21, 2001
 Followed: Solar eclipse of September 13, 2015

Half-Saros 
 Preceded: Lunar eclipse of July 28, 1999
 Followed: Lunar eclipse of August 7, 2017

Tritos 
 Preceded: Solar eclipse of September 2, 1997
 Followed: Solar eclipse of July 2, 2019

Solar Saros 126 
 Preceded: Solar eclipse of July 22, 1990
 Followed: Solar eclipse of August 12, 2026

Inex 
 Preceded: Solar eclipse of August 22, 1979
 Followed: Solar eclipse of July 13, 2037

Solar eclipses 2008–2011

Saros 126

Metonic series

Notes

References 

 Google Map

Photos:
Russian solar eclipse 
Russian scientist observed eclipse
 Spaceweather.com solar eclipse gallery
 Total Solar Eclipse, August 1, 2008, from Russia by Jay Pasachoff
 Prof. Druckmüller's eclipse photography site. Mongolia
 Prof. Druckmüller's eclipse photography site. Russia
 The 2008 Eclipse in Russia
 Astronomy.com Eclipse trip images from Russia
 Memories, video and images of the eclipse by Crayford Manor House Astronomical Society
 The 2008 Eclipse in Russia
  APOD 8/5/2008, A Total Solar Eclipse Over China, wide sky from near Barkol in Xinjiang, China
  APOD 8/7/2008, At the Sun's Edge, Totality from Novosibirsk, Russia
  APOD 8/8/2008, The Crown of the Sun, totality with corona from Kochenevo, Russia
  APOD 9/20/2008,A Darkened Sky, totality with wide corona from Mongolia
 Webcast of the eclipse from northwest China
 University of North Dakota's Live Webcast from China

Video
Video from Altai, featured on CNN 

2008 08 01
2008 in science
2008 08 01
Novaya Zemlya
August 2008 events
2008 in Russia
2008 in Mongolia
2008 in China
2008 in Kazakhstan